Ebasco Services was a United States-based designer and constructor of energy infrastructure, most notably nuclear power plants.

History
The company was formed from the Electric Bond and Share Company, a holding company that sold securities of electric utilities. It was created by General Electric in 1905. Electric Bond and Share was restructured after the Public Utility Holding Company Act of 1935, forming EBASCO Services, a provider of engineering consulting and construction services. Among other projects EBASCO designed nuclear power plants.

By the 1980s, EBASCO had three divisions: EBASCO Engineering, which provided engineering design and A/E services, EBASCO Environmental, which provided environmental engineering and science services, and EBASCO Constructors, which provided construction and construction management.

Ebasco (EBS) was included in Dow Jones Utility Average from  1938 to 1947.

Ebasco Services was one of major US architect-engineers, coordinated design of many nuclear power plants both in the USA and abroad including the Fukushima Daiichi Nuclear Power Plant (units 1, 2 and 6).

EBASCO Engineering and Constructors were sold to Raytheon in 1993 and became part of a Raytheon subsidiary, United Engineers and Constructors. EBASCO Environmental was sold to Enserch Environmental before being sold to Foster Wheeler, Inc., becoming Foster Wheeler Environmental.

Whistleblowing case
Nuclear whistleblower Ronald J. Goldstein was a supervisor employed by EBASCO, which was a major contractor for the construction of Houston Lighting and Power Company's South Texas Project (a complex of two nuclear power plants). In the summer of 1985, Goldstein identified safety problems to SAFETEAM, an internal compliance program established by EBASCO and Houston Lighting, including noncompliance with safety procedures, the failure to issue safety compliance reports, and quality control violations affecting the safety of the plant.

SAFETEAM was promoted as an independent safe haven for employees to voice their safety concerns. The two companies did not inform their employees that they did not believe complaints reported to SAFETEAM had any legal protection. After he filed his report to SAFETEAM, Goldstein was fired. Subsequently, Golstein filed suit under federal nuclear whistleblower statutes.

The U.S. Department of Labor ruled that his submissions to SAFETEAM were protected and his dismissal was invalid, a finding upheld by Labor Secretary Lynn Martin. The ruling was appealed and overturned by the Fifth Circuit Court of Appeals, which ruled that private programs offered no protection to whistleblowers. After Goldstein lost his case, Congress amended the federal nuclear whistleblower law to provide protection reports made to internal systems and prevent retaliation against whistleblowers.

References

American companies disestablished in 1993
1993 disestablishments in the United States
Construction and civil engineering companies established in 1935
1935 establishments in the United States
Raytheon Company
General Electric
American companies established in 1935